Boats to Build is an album by American singer-songwriter Guy Clark, released in 1992.

Guests include Sam Bush, Rodney Crowell, Marty Stuart, Emmylou Harris and Jerry Douglas.

Track listing
 "Baton Rouge" (Clark, J. C. Crowley) – 2:46
 "Picasso's Mandolin" (Clark, Radney Foster, Bill Lloyd) – 2:50
 "How'd You Get This Number" (Guy Clark, Susanna Clark) – 3:30
 "Boats to Build" (Clark, Verlon Thompson) – 3:45
 "Too Much" (Clark, Lee Roy Parnell) – 2:51
 "Ramblin' Jack & Mahan" (Clark, Richard Leigh) – 3:40
 "I Don't Love You Much Do I" (Clark, Richard Leigh) – 2:36
 "Jack of All Trades" (Clark, Rodney Crowell) – 3:36
 "Madonna w/Child ca. 1969" (Clark) – 2:56
 "Must Be My Baby" (Clark) – 2:52

Personnel
Guy Clark – vocals, guitar
Brian Ahern – guitar
Sam Bush – mandolin
Bill Caswell – jaw harp
Travis Clark – bass
Rodney Crowell – background vocals
Jerry Douglas – dobro, Slide Guitar
Radney Foster – background vocals
Emmylou Harris – background vocals
Bill Lloyd – guitar, background vocals
Kenny Malone – drums, percussion, conga
Lee Roy Parnell – slide guitar
Suzi Ragsdale – background vocals
Marty Stuart – mandolin
Verlon Thompson – guitar, background vocals

Production notes
Miles Wilkinson – producer
Carlos Grier – engineer, mastering
Ben Sandmel – liner notes
Aimee MacAuley – design
Jim McGuire – photography

References

1992 albums
Guy Clark albums
Elektra Records albums